The Garrett TFE731 (now  Honeywell TFE731) is a family of geared turbofan engines commonly used on business jet aircraft. Garrett AiResearch originally designed and built the engine, which due to mergers was later produced by AlliedSignal and now Honeywell Aerospace.

Since the engine was introduced in 1972, over 11,000 engines have been built, flying over 100 million flight-hours.

Development

The TFE731 was based on the core of the TSCP700, which was specifically developed for use as the auxiliary power unit (APU) on the McDonnell Douglas DC-10. The design featured two important factors: low fuel consumption, and low noise profiles that met the newly established U.S. noise abatement regulations.

The first test run of the TFE731 occurred in 1970 at Garrett's plant in Torrance, California.  The first production model, the TFE731-2, began rolling off the assembly line in August, 1972, and was used on the Learjet 35/36 and Dassault Falcon 10, both of which entered production in 1973.

The TFE731-3 was developed for use in the Lockheed JetStar re-engining program, and subsequent versions of it have been used on a number of aircraft, including the Learjet 55.

In 1975, the TFE731 was named Aviation Product of the Year by Ziff-Davis Publishing Company.

The -5 model was certified in 1982, and a decade later, an engine utilizing the TFE731-5 power section and a TFE731-3 fan was built and designated the TFE731-4, intended to power the Cessna Citation VII aircraft.

The most recent version is the TFE731-50, based on the -60 used on the Falcon 900DX, which underwent its flight test program in 2005. Honeywell has developed this engine complete with nacelle as a candidate to retrofit a number of aircraft equipped with older engines.

Design

The TFE731-60 has an inlet diameter of 0.787 m.  The fan consists of 22 fan blades, 52 exit-guide vanes, and ten struts, and is driven by a gearbox. The five-stage compressor has four axial (LP) stages and one radial or centrifugal (HP) stage.

Variants
TFE731-2
TFE731-3
TFE731-4
TFE731-5
TFE731-20
TFE731-40
TFE731-50
TFE731-60
TFE731-1100

Applications
Jet trainers

Business jets

Specifications

See also

Notes

References

External links

 Honeywell TFE731 official website 

Centrifugal-flow turbojet engines
Geared turbofan engines
Honeywell
Medium-bypass turbofan engines
Mixed-compressor gas turbines
1970s turbofan engines